The 1932 Wiley Wildcats football team was an American football team that represented Wiley College in the Southwestern Athletic Conference (SWAC) during the 1932 college football season. In their tenth season under head coach Fred T. Long, the team compiled a 9–0 record, won the SWAC championship, shut out eight of nine opponents, and outscored all opponents by a total of 278 to 8.  The 1932 Wiley team was recognized as the black college national champion.

Schedule

References

Wiley
Wiley Wildcats football seasons
Black college football national champions
Southwestern Athletic Conference football champion seasons
College football undefeated seasons
Wiley Wildcats football